Chakra is a proprietary JScript engine developed by Microsoft. It is used in the Internet Explorer web browser.

Microsoft later developed a new JavaScript engine for its Microsoft Edge browser, which is confusingly also called Chakra. Microsoft Edge switched to the V8 JavaScript engine in 2020.

Features 
A distinctive feature of the engine is that it JIT compiles scripts on a separate CPU core, parallel to the web browser. Though Microsoft has in the past pointed out that other elements, such as rendering and marshalling, are just as important for a browser's overall performance, their improvements to the engine were in response to evolving competing browsers, compared to which IE8 was lagging behind in terms of client-side script processing speed.

History 
SunSpider tests performed on November 18, 2009 showed the PDC version of IE9 executing scripts much faster than IE8, but slower than Firefox 3.6, Chrome 4, and WebKit Nightly. The same test performed on March 15, 2010 showed the first IE9 Platform Preview (using the then-current version of Chakra) to be faster than Firefox (with SpiderMonkey), but slower than Safari (with SquirrelFish Extreme), Chrome (with V8), and Opera (with Carakan).

On March 8, 2011, Microsoft published results showing the 32-bit Internet Explorer 9 to be faster than Safari, Firefox (with TraceMonkey), Chrome, and Opera.

March 2011 performance tests for ZDNet concluded that Internet Explorer 9 (32-bit), Chrome 10, and Firefox 4 release candidate were "pretty evenly matched."

In 2012, subsequent versions of Chakra, such as the version included in Internet Explorer 10, introduced additional performance changes, including JIT compilation on x64 and ARM architectures, and optimizations related to floating point math and garbage collection.

References

2011 software
JavaScript engines
Microsoft free software
Windows-only free software